John Martin Antaramian (born September 21, 1954) is an American businessman and politician serving as the 50th mayor of Kenosha, Wisconsin. Prior to his re-election in 2016, Antaramian had served as the 48th mayor of Kenosha for 16 years and before that was a member of the Wisconsin State Assembly.

Early life and education
Born and raised in Kenosha, Wisconsin, Antaramian earned a Bachelor of Science in economics and business management from the University of Wisconsin–Parkside in 1977.

Career

Pre-2016 
Antaramian served in the Wisconsin State Assembly for ten years. In 1992, Antaramian was elected Mayor of Kenosha, and served for sixteen years, stepping down in 2008. In 2008, he retired and started a consulting business. He was a visiting professor at Carthage College before returning to the mayoral office in 2016.

2016-present 
Antaramian ran for mayor again in 2016, running for the open seat vacated by retiring two-term mayor Keith Bosman, who had replaced Antaramian as mayor in 2008. Antaramian defeated Alderman Bob Johnson in the general election.

Antaramian ran unopposed for mayor in and was elected to a sixth term in the spring of 2020. In October 2020, Antaramian participated in a challenge with the mayors of Wisconsin's five largest cities (Racine's Cory Mason, Milwaukee's Tom Barrett, Green Bay's Eric Genrich, and Madison's Satya Rhodes-Conway) to see which city would have the highest rate of absentee and early voting. An investigation led by Michael Gableman on possible fraud in the 2020 presidential election in Wisconsin subpoenaed Antaramian and the same four mayors in October 2021 regarding election funding received by their cities from the Center for Tech and Civic Life. Antaramian described the investigation as a waste of time and money.

Shooting of Jacob Blake 
Following the unrest that followed the shooting of Jacob Blake in August 2020, Antaramian requested the presence of the Wisconsin National Guard in Kenosha. Hundreds of protesters later forced Antaramian to relocate his press conference on the shooting from a local park to the city's public safety building, where the protestors were contained by police with pepper spray after tearing the building's front entrance door from its hinges. Antaramian also announced he would hold 4 community listening sessions on racism.

In an interview days after the shooting, Antaramian said visits to Kenosha by President Donald Trump or then-candidate Joe Biden would be "too soon," saying that "...the President is always welcome, but at this time, it's just the wrong time." Trump would visit on September 1, and Biden on September 3.

See also
List of mayors of Kenosha, Wisconsin

References

|-

|-

|-

Mayors of Kenosha, Wisconsin
Democratic Party members of the Wisconsin State Assembly
American people of Armenian descent
University of Wisconsin–Parkside alumni
Carthage College faculty
Businesspeople from Wisconsin
1954 births
Living people
Ethnic Armenian politicians